A metric engine is an American expression which refers to an internal combustion engine, often for automobiles, whose underlying engineering design is based on a metric system of units, particularly SI.

As American industry converted from traditional units to SI in the late 20th century, the automotive industry responded by transitioning its auto and engine designs to be "metric" rather than "English".

Characteristics
A metric engine has one or more of the following characteristics:

Tools
 A metric engine may require metric tools for repair, such as wrench and socket sets designed to fit metric fasteners.

Units
 Displacement of the engine's cylinders measured in liters or cubic centimeters (cm³).

Previously, American engine displacement was most typically measured in cubic inches (in³).  Many classic American automobiles had engines popularly known by the displacement of their engine, such as the "350" Chevrolet Small-block, the Ford 302 and 427, or the Chrysler "426 Hemi".

Beginning around the 1970s, most of the U.S. automakers began converting their engine designations from cubic inches to liters.  Thus, in 1970, the V-8 engine in the Cadillac Eldorado grew to 500 cubic inches, but was badged "8.2 Liters" for the first time.

Once this conversion was complete, engines worldwide were most commonly referred to by their displacement in liters.  This conversion must have caused some marketing dilemmas: Ford's "302 Windsor" engine, which displaced approximately 4942 cc, became badged "5.0" after metric conversion.

Some usage of cubic inches continues in the 21st century, such as in traditional American-style motorcycles; and the occasional new-era muscle car, such as the 2004 Dodge Viper, which boasted a 500 cubic inch (8,193 cc), 500 horsepower (373 kW) engine, or the Ford "427" concept car.  In the case of such cars, the use of cubic inches, rather than the metric cubic centimeters, can be considered vestigial.

Footnotes

 The terms SI and metric system are not strictly interchangeable; the common "metric system" refers to a system of units based on powers of 10, for example, the cgs system; while SI was originally based on the MKS system of units.  However, such distinctions are not relevant in the typical engine repair facility.

Automobile engines
Metrication in the United States